Toma or TOMA may refer to:

Places
Toma, Burkina Faso, a town in Nayala province
Toma Department, a department in Nayala province
Toma, Banwa, Burkina Faso, a town
Tōma, Hokkaidō, Japan, a town
Tōma Station, its railway station
Toma, a town in East New Britain, Papua New Guinea

People
Toma (name), list of people with this name
Loma people or Toma, an ethnic group from border region between Guinea and Liberia
Loma language

Music and television
Toma (TV series), an American series
"Toma" (song), by rapper Pitbull
"Toma" (song), by artist Puscifer

Other uses

La Toma, a 1598 assertion of Spanish possession of land north of Rio Grande
Siege of Toma, a military action in 1914 in German New Guinea
Texas Open Meetings Act
 Theatre Orchestra Musicians Association (TOMA), part of the Media, Entertainment and Arts Alliance, Australia
Tōma, Kendo term for "long distance"
Toma cheese, Italian cheese
Top of mind awareness, a marketing term
TOMA (vehicle), armored vehicle against riots
TOMA (Caldas da Rainha), municipal bus service in city of west central Portugal

See also

Tova (disambiguation)